Anthony John Farrant (20 June 1955, in Fairlie – 9 March 2013, in Australia) was a New Zealand cricketer who played for Canterbury in the Plunket Shield.

Farrant was an accurate right-arm medium-pace bowler who moved the ball through the air and off the pitch. His younger brother David also played for Canterbury.

References

External links
 from Cricinfo

1955 births
2013 deaths
New Zealand cricketers
Canterbury cricketers
People from Fairlie, New Zealand
Cricketers from Canterbury, New Zealand